Rotštejn are ruins of a rock castle around  east of Turnov on the border of the Nature Reserve "Klokočské rocks". The castle was partially built of stone walls and partially carved in the sandstone rocks where it stands. The most famous owner of the castle though was Wok II of Rotštejn.

History
The castle was built shortly before 1250 by members of the Markwartic family. The first owner cited was Jaroslav of Hrutwice, today Hruštice, who built the castle for his son Vok of Rotštejn. For his second son, Zdeněk, he built Valdštejn Castle and became the founder of the Waldstein family.

In 1360 the castle was in the possession of Ješek of Rotštejn, who obtained permission from Charles IV to hold a weekly market in the nearby village of Klokočí. In the year 1415, the Rotštejn family died out and the whole estate fell to Andrew and Vanek Paldrovi Varina, who owned the entire estate throughout the Hussite Wars. The castle was probably burned by the Hussites, unlike other neighboring castles, such as Návarov Castle. According to other sources, the castle was conquered in 1426, but its landlord lived on a farm in the nearby village of Klokočí. Hussite presence at the castle is not confirmed by archaeological findings and written sources. In a later written mention of the castle in 1540, it is reported as abandoned, with the rocks and walls demolished in the courtyard.

To further contributed to the destruction of the castle was the natural erosion of the sandstone rocks. In a report of 1514 the castle was considered abandoned with walls and rocks warped in the courtyard. During the Thirty Years' War in the beginning of the 17th century, this place was used to shelter people from the soldiers. Residents were hiding in cavities carved into the sandstone rocks that were mistakenly considered part of the castle stables.

Construction
Rotštejn castle was erected with strong elements of brick architecture. Adjacent rocks, which also served as part of the defense system. Safety elements were supplemented by the usual means of that time, such as gateways, bridges, bastion. These structural safety elements, however, have been preserved, but can only be seen in carved niches. All castle walls disappeared. The form of the castle was preserved in written documents.

Since 1988 the civil protection association of Klokočské rocks led chatelaine H.T. Hlubučková. Wooden walkways and paths were built, through which visitors can get to the top of the castle and view a panorama of the Klokočské rocks. The castle area is also a small center for environmental and ecological education.

Legend
According to a legend treasure was hidden under Rotštejn. Several people from the surrounding area gathered to look for the treasure on Easter Friday. On this day the earth cracked before them and a pile of money appeared like dancing blue flames. Only one of them dared to go for the treasure. The earth closed over him and he fell asleep beside the treasure. When he awoke, he did not see the treasure. For some time he looked for a way back home, when he found the way he returned home. There he realised that he was away from home for a whole year and that his neighbors discovered the treasure. But the quest for the treasure cost their lives. For a time he was happy with what he was given by his honest friends, and soon he traveled to where money is not worth a thing, where the real treasure is what men have in their hearts.

Points of interest
 Kozákov - guardian mountain of the Bohemian Paradise
 Hrubý Rohozec – château
 Valdštejn Castle  
 Hrubá Skála – château
 Vranov Castle 
 Kopanina – watchtower
 Trosky – ruins
 Klokočské skály  - nature reserve (sandrock town)

Gallery

References

Attribution

This article is based on the translation of the corresponding article of the Czech Wikipedia. A list of contributors can be found there at the History section.

External links

 Official webpage of the castle Rotštejn
 Rotštejn at NorthBohemia.info
 Rotštejn at "Greenway Jizera"
 Rotštejn at Czech tourism

Castles in the Czech Republic
Rock castles
Tourist attractions in the Liberec Region
Castles in the Liberec Region
Semily District